Frontera (Spanish "border") may refer to:

Geography
Argentina
Frontera, Santa Fe, a town in Castellanos Department, Santa Fe province
 Chile
La Frontera, Chile, a geographical region in Chile, bordering on Araucanía
Mexico
Fronteras, Sonora
Frontera Municipality, a municipality in Coahuila state
Ciudad Frontera, a town in Coahuila state
Frontera, Tabasco, a town in Centla Municipality, Tabasco state
Spain
La Frontera, the Border of Granada, a region in southern Spain
La Frontera, Cuenca, a municipality in province of Cuenca, Castile-La Mancha, Spain
La Frontera, Santa Cruz de Tenerife, a municipality in province of Santa Cruz de Tenerife, Canary Islands, Spain
Arcos de la Frontera, a municipality in province of Cádiz, Andalusia, Spain
Jerez de la Frontera, a municipality in province of Cádiz, Andalusia, Spain
Vejer de la Frontera, a municipality in province of Cádiz, Andalusia, Spain
USA
La Frontera (Round Rock, Texas), a development in Texas, USA

Books and publications
Frontera (Tijuana), a newspaper
Editorial Frontera, Argentine comics publisher
Frontera, a science fiction novel by Lewis Shiner
La Frontera (newspaper),  a former newspaper in South Texas, United States
Borderlands/La Frontera: The New Mestiza, a 1987 Gloria E. Anzaldúa book.
La Frontera, a newsletter of Association for Borderlands Studies

Film and TV
Frontera (1980 film), a 1980 Mexican film
Frontera (2014 film), a 2014 American film
La Frontera (film), a 1991 Chilean film
La frontera (telenovela), Mexican telenovela

Music
La Frontera (band), a Spanish rock band, played at 1994 Caribana Festival
Frontera (Fly Pan Am album), 2021

Other
Opel Frontera, an early body-on-frame SUV developed by Isuzu
Frontera Grill, a restaurant in Chicago, Illinois, USA